Chanakya Sapatham is a 1986 Indian Telugu language action film starring Chiranjeevi, Vijayashanti, Rao Gopal Rao and Satyanarayana, produced  by D. V. S. Raju and directed by K. Raghavendra Rao.

The film has musical score by Chakravarthy. The film marked the third collaboration of Chiranjeevi with director Raghavendra Rao after two highly successful films : Adavi Donga and Kondaveeti Raja. However, unlike their previous ventures Chanakya Sapatham was a critical and commercial disappointment. Paruchuri brothers had scripted all the three films.

Plot 
Chanakya (Chiranjeevi), a Customs officer at airport is the son of a Military Major (Satyanarayana) who is about to be awarded Padmasree for his services. Chanakya catches the smuggling ring of Rana (Rao Gopal Rao) and in retaliation they prove that Chanakya's father is smuggling diamonds. Faced with humiliation, Chanakya challenges the villains of proving his father's innocence and bringing the culprits to justice. Vijayasanthi is the airhostess who works with Chanakya, who has problems with her sister's family, for her mother-in-law always threatens for more dowry. The rest of the story deals with how both of them fight for their causes in settling their professional and personal issues and come out successfully to be united in the marital knot forms the story.

Cast

Soundtrack

References

External links
 

1986 films
Films directed by K. Raghavendra Rao
Films scored by K. Chakravarthy
1980s Telugu-language films